The following lists events that happened during 1942 in Chile.

Incumbents
President of Chile: Jerónimo Méndez (until 2 April), Juan Antonio Ríos

Events

February
1 February – Chilean presidential election, 1942 is held giving Juan Antonio Rios elected as President of the Republic.

March
7–17 March – The 1942 South American Basketball Championship is held in Santiago.

May
12 May - The Catholic University rugby team of the city of Santiago, Santiago Metropolitan Region, is founded.

July
24 July - The College of Pharmacists of Chile is founded under Law No. 7,205, constituting itself as a Trade association.

September
6 September - At 9:43 p.m. there was an Earthquake of 7.3 degrees on Richter magnitude scale and whose epicenter was located in the vicinity of Caldera, Atacama Region . It left a balance of 5 dead, 16 injured and 705 homeless; It also caused a medium intensity Tsunami between Lima, Peru and Puerto Saavedra in the Araucania Region.

November
20 November - The National Prize of Literature the country's largest literature award, is created; This under Law No. 7,368, which also creates the National Prize of Art of Chile that begins to be awarded since 1944.

December
18 December - the Quinta Normal Fire Department is founded in the Commune of Quinta Normal in Santiago.

Births 

23 January – Pedro Araya Toro
1 May – Carlos Cardoen
1 June – Honorino Landa (d. 1987)
24 June – Eduardo Frei Ruiz-Tagle
9 August – Miguel Littín
10 August – Augusto Parra Muñoz, diplomat
8 September – Beatriz Allende (d. 1977)
6 December – Rubén Marcos (d. 2006)
27 December – Juan Inostroza

Deaths
9 August – Juan Subercaseaux (b. 1896)

References 

 
Years of the 20th century in Chile
Chile